Such Is Life in the Tropics is a 2016 Ecuadorian thriller film directed by Sebastián Cordero. It was selected as the Ecuadorian entry for the Best Foreign Language Film at the 89th Academy Awards but it was not nominated.

Cast
 Diego Cataño
 Maya Zapata
 Andrés Crespo
 Erando González
 Daniel Adum Gilbert
 Victor Arauz
 Antonella Valeriano
 Andrea Casierra

See also
 List of submissions to the 89th Academy Awards for Best Foreign Language Film
 List of Ecuadorian submissions for the Academy Award for Best Foreign Language Film

References

External links
 

2016 films
2016 thriller films
Ecuadorian drama films
2010s Spanish-language films
Films directed by Sebastián Cordero